Spring Creek formerly known as West Creek, and Round Valley Creek, is a stream, tributary to West Deep Creek in White Pine County, Nevada with its source in Juab County, Utah.

From there it flows northwest across the Spring Creek Flat into Nevada to join an unnamed stream to form West Deep Creek, at an elevation of  near Eightmile, Nevada the former site of Eightmile Station, (a Pony Express then a stagecoach station of the Overland Mail Company), eight miles northwest of Goshute, Utah.

References 

Bodies of water of White Pine County, Nevada
Bodies of water of Juab County, Utah